Réveil-Sportif is a football club of Martinique, based in the eastern town Gros-Morne.

Founded in 1938 as Gros-Morne Club, they play in Martinique's first division, the Martinique Championnat National.

Achievements

External links
 2007/2008 Club info – Antilles-Foot
 Club info – French Football Federation

References

Football clubs in Martinique
Association football clubs established in 1938
1938 establishments in Martinique